The Friedensthal Mission, southwest of Christiansted in Saint Croix, U.S. Virgin Islands, was partly built by 1830.  Also known as Friedensthal Moravian Church, it was listed on the National Register of Historic Places in 1978.  In German, Fridensthal means "valley of peace".
 
The mission complex is significant as it was one of the first Moravian missions in the Virgin Islands, and it played a role in preparing slaves for emancipation.

References

National Register of Historic Places in the United States Virgin Islands
Buildings and structures completed in 1830
Christian missions
Moravian churches in the United States Virgin Islands